Artem Gordeev a.k.a. Artyom Gordeyev (born 15 September 1988) is a Russian former professional ice hockey player.

Awards and achievements
 2007/2008 Russian Superleague Champion
 2008 WJC Bronze Medal
 2010/2011 KHL Gagarin Cup
 2011/2012, 2012/2013, 2014/2015 SHL Petrov Cup
 2015 Winter Universiade Gold Medal

Career statistics

International statistics

References

1988 births
Living people
Russian ice hockey centres
Salavat Yulaev Ufa players
Universiade medalists in ice hockey
Universiade gold medalists for Russia
Competitors at the 2015 Winter Universiade